Vikør may refer to:

Vikør, former name for Kvam, Norway
Lars Vikør (born 1946), Norwegian linguist, translator and educator

See also
 Vicor Corporation